The Eparchy of Zahumlje, Herzegovina and the Littoral is an eparchy (diocese) of the Serbian Orthodox Church with its seat in Mostar, Bosnia and Herzegovina. It has jurisdiction over the region of Herzegovina, the littoral region of southern Dalmatia in Croatia and a small part of Montenegro. Since 2018, the bishop of Zahumlje and Herzegovina has been Dimitrije Rađenović.

History

Ecclesiastical background
The region was under the Eastern Orthodox Metropolitanate of Dyrrachium, which in turn was under the Ecumenical Patriarchate of Constantinople or the Archbishopric of Bar. In 1089, the see of Trebinje (Travunia) was briefly theoretically under the jurisdiction of the Archbishopric of Bar. The territory was constantly in a feudal state of continuous religious wars between the Roman Catholic and Eastern Orthodox denominations long before the incursion of Islamic invaders.

Middle Ages
The Eparchy of Hum or Zahumlje was founded in 1219, by the first Serbian Archbishop Sava, the same year the Serbian Orthodox Church acquired its autocephaly status from the Patriarchate of Constantinople. Thus, it was one of the original Serbian Orthodox bishoprics. It had jurisdiction over the historical regions of Zahumlje and Travunija. The first Bishop of Hum was Ilarion, succeeded by Sava II (son of Stefan the First-Crowned). The original seat was in Ston, in the church of the Most Holy Theotokos (Пресвете Богородице). Following an earthquake, the bishop moved the seat to the Monastery of Holy Apostles in the valley of river Lim in the 1250s. From that time, the Eparchy of Hum was sometimes also called "Eparchy of Lim".

With the War of Hum (1326–1329), most of Zahumlje was taken over by Stephen II, Ban of Bosnia, but the Travunija region remained under the rule of Serbian Kings. After the creation of the Serbian Patriarchate of Peć in 1346, all original Serbian bishops were raised to the honorary rank of metropolitan bishops. Pope Clement VI in 1335 addresses to King Stefan Dušan and request him to stop the persecution and that to the bishop of Kotor which is responsible for Roman Catholic Diocese of Trebinje return monasteries, churches, islands and villages, which some kings of Raška before him overtook. The see of the eparchy was then moved to the Mileševa monastery. In the middle of 15th century, Metropolitan David was a very influential figure in the court of Stefan Kosača, who was titled Duke (Herzeg) of Saint Sava. Following the fall of the Duchy of St. Sava to the Ottoman Empire (1482), the see was frequently moved, finally to settle in the Tvrdoš Monastery near Trebinje in 1508. Eventually, the eparchy was further divided into the Eparchy of Mileševa.

Modern and contemporary history
In 1557, Serbian Patriarchate of Peć was restored and the Eparchy of Herzegovina was returned to its jurisdiction, with its bishops holding the honorary title of metropolitan. In 1766, when the Serbian Patriarchate of Peć was abolished, Eparchy of Herzegovina and all other Serbian eparchies under Ottoman rule came under the jurisdiction of Ecumenical Patriarchate of Constantinople. Bishops of Herzegovina kept their honorary title of Metropolitan, as was also the custom in the Ecumenical Patriarchate. 

The seat of metropolitan was transferred to Mostar. Since 1878, the territory of Bosnia and Herzegovina was under the occupation of Austria-Hungary, but under the Church Convention of 1880, all Eastern Orthodox eparchies remained under the ecclesiastical jurisdiction of the Ecumenical Patriarchate of Constantinople. At the end of the First World War in 1918, Eastern Orthodox bishops in Bosnia and Herzegovina reached a unanimous decision to enter the united Serbian Orthodox Church. The process of unification was completed in 1920 and since then the Eparchy of Zahumlje and Herzegovina has remained part of the Serbian Orthodox Church. The seat of the eparchy was the Cathedral of the Holy Trinity, Mostar. As of 2017, it is being rebuilt after being demolished during the Bosnian War (1992–1995).

After the restoration of the Serbian Orthodox Church (1920), and with the Church Constitution (1931), diocese comprised the districts Mostar, Bileća, Gacko, nevesinje, Stolac, and Trebinje, the towns of Metković and Dubrovnik and the island of Korčula, the birthplace of Marco Polo. Districts of Foča and Čajniče were allotted to the Diocese of Dabar-Bosnia. Since the  Serbian Orthodox Church integration of 1920, the bishops of Zahumlje and Herzegovina were Jovan Ilić (1926-1931), Simon Stanković (1932-1934), Tihon Radovanović (1934-1939), Nikolaj Jovanović (1940-1943), Longin Tomić (1951-1955) and Vladislav Mitrović (1955-1991). At the meeting of the Holy Synod of the Serbian Orthodox Church in 1992, Dr. Atanasije Jevtić was elected for the Bishop of the Eparchy of Zahumlje and Herzegovina.

World War II
During World War II from 1941 to 1943 on the territory of the Eparchy of Zahumlje and Herzegovina 19 churches were damaged or destroyed. Nine parish homes were either heavily damaged or totally destroyed. Twelve (12) libraries and 21 church archives were completely destroyed.

Serbia in the Yugoslav Wars
Also, during the breakup of Yugoslavia and the ensuing civil war of 1991-1993, the Eparchy of Zahumlje and Herzegovina of all the Serbian Orthodox eparchies sustained the most damage. Twenty-four (24) churches were destroyed and 16 churches were heavily damaged, in addition to the monastery of  Zavala. Three chapels were damaged or destroyed in their entirety. Two parish houses were destroyed, one mined and the other set on fire. Bishop's Palace in Mostar and the Bishop's house in Dubrovnik were destroyed, as well. Also, ten cemeteries were either destroyed or desecrated.

In Mostar, where the see of Zahumlje and Herzegovina was located, everything belonging to the Serbian Orthodox Church was destroyed. The Cathedral of the Holy Trinity, constructed in 1873 at a time of occupation,  between 7 and 8 June 1992, was shelled, and on 15 June (on the second day of the Pentecost) the belltowers were destroyed and the cathedral was set ablaze. Subsequently, the remaining walls were mined, and the monumental shrine was turned into rubble.

The old church built in the 16th century in honor of the Birth of the Virgin Mary, situated in the cemetery of Mostar, was also destroyed. The Bishop's Palace, built in the 19th century, was mined while the monastery of Zitomislic which suffered damages in World War II, also met the same fate in the war of 1991-1993. (The survey of damaged, destroyed and desecrated churches, monasteries, and other church buildings during the war of 1991-1993 was cited from the archives of the Museum of the Serbian Orthodox Church.)

Heads

Ilarion (13th century) 
Metodije (13th century)
Teodosije (13th century)
Nikola (13th century)
Sava (until 1264) 
Jevstatije (ca. 1305)
Jovan I (ca. 1316)
Danilo (1316–1324)
Stefan I (1324)
Mileševa (ca. 1377)
David (ca. 1465)
Jovan II (1508–1513)
Visarion I (1509–1525)
Maksim I (before 1532)
Marko (1531–1534)
Nikanor (1534–1546)
Antonije (1570–1573)
Savatije I (1573–1585)
Visarion II (1590–1602)
Silvestar (1602–1611)
Simeon I (1613–1635)
Savatije II (1635–1642)
Maksim II (1643–1648)
Pajsije (1648–1651)
Arsenije I (1651)
Vasilije (1651–1671)
Simeon II (1671–1681)
Savatije III (1681–1693)
Nektarije (1693–1712)
Melentije (1712–1713)
Arsenije II (1715)
Gerasim (1715–1727)
Aksentije I (1727–1736)
Filotej (1741–1741)
Aksentije II (1751–1760)
Stefan II (1763–1766)
Antim (1766–1772)
Likanije (1772–1802)
Jeremija (1803–1815)
Josif I (1816–1835)
Prokopije I (1838–1848)
Josif II (1848–1854)
Grigorije I (1855–1860)
Joanikije (1860–1864)
Prokopije II (1864–1875)
Ignjatije (1875–1888)
Leontije (1888)
Serafim (1889–1903)
Petar (1903–1920)
Jovan III Ilić (1926–1931)
Simeon III Stanković (1932–1934)
Tihon Radovanović (1934–1939)
Nikolaj Jovanović (1939–1943)
Longin Tomić (1951–1955)
Vladislav Mitrović (1955–1991)
Atanasije (1992–1999)
Grigorije II (1999–2018)
Dimitrije (2018–)

Monasteries

There are eight monasteries in the diocese:
Dobrićevo
Duži
Žitomislić
Zavala
Zubci
Petropavlov
Tvrdoš
Hercegovačka Gračanica

See also
Eastern Orthodoxy in Bosnia and Herzegovina
Serbs of Bosnia and Herzegovina
List of the Eparchies of the Serbian Orthodox Church
Cathedral of the Holy Trinity, Mostar
Holy Annunciation Orthodox church, Dubrovnik

References

Sources

External links
 Eparchy of Zahumlje and Herzegovina 

Serbian Orthodox Church in Bosnia and Herzegovina
Serbian Orthodox Church in Croatia
Serbian Orthodox Church in Montenegro
Religion in Republika Srpska
Herzegovina
Mostar
1219 establishments in Europe
Religious organizations established in the 1210s
Dioceses established in the 13th century
Religious sees of the Serbian Orthodox Church